Vincenzo Rabatta (1589–1654) was a Roman Catholic prelate who served as Archbishop of Chieti (1649–1654).

Biography
Vincenzo Rabatta was born in 1589 in Pescia, Italy.
On 9 Dec 1649, he was appointed during the papacy of Pope Innocent X as Archbishop of Chieti.
On 2 Jan 1650, he was consecrated bishop by Marcantonio Franciotti, Cardinal-Priest of Santa Maria della Pace, with Giovanni Battista Rinuccini, Archbishop of Fermo, and Giambattista Spínola (seniore), Archbishop of Acerenza e Matera, serving as co-consecrators. 
He served as Archbishop of Chieti until his death in 1654.

References

External links and additional sources
 (for Chronology of Bishops) 
 (for Chronology of Bishops) 

17th-century Italian Roman Catholic archbishops
Bishops appointed by Pope Innocent X
1589 births
1654 deaths